Rabbit Valley is a valley in Catoosa County, Georgia and Hamilton County, Tennessee.  It is also a valley in Bradley County, Tennessee (adjacent to Hamilton County).

History
Rabbit Valley was so named because its rocky terrain was suitable for rabbits, or because a large number of rabbits lived there, according to local history.

References

Geography of Catoosa County, Georgia
Geography of Hamilton County, Tennessee
Valleys of Tennessee